The Seven Oaks Sportsplex is an indoor ice hockey and soccer complex in Winnipeg, Manitoba, Canada. The complex consists of the Seven Oaks Arena and the Seven Oaks Soccer Complex (formerly Garden City Soccer Complex). It is located on the grounds of the Garden City Community Centre, immediately east of the Garden City Shopping Centre, in the Garden City area.

Facilities

Soccer Complex 
Prior to a major expansion in 2014–15, the Garden City Soccer Complex (as it was then known) underwent a $20-million expansion as part of a new joint venture between the community centre and the Winnipeg Soccer Federation.  The new Soccerplex opened in 2015 and was used as a training facility for the 2015 FIFA Women's World Cup.

Arena 
The Seven Oaks Arena is an ice hockey facility that opened in 2015. It was constructed at a cost of $18 million under a cost-sharing agreement between the City of Winnipeg, the provincial government, and the community centre. Following the opening of Seven Oaks Arena, the city closed the obsolete Old Exhibition and Vimy Arenas.

The arena has two National Hockey League-size rinks, each with seating for 350 spectators.  It is mainly used by local minor hockey teams and for private sports clinics. The arena is also home to the Raiders Junior Hockey Club of the Manitoba Major Junior Hockey League. The arena has also played host to the Manitoba Junior Hockey League's annual showcase in 2018 and 2019.

References

External links
Garden City Community Centre

2015 establishments in Manitoba
Indoor arenas in Manitoba
Indoor ice hockey venues in Canada
Indoor soccer venues
Soccer venues in Manitoba
Sports venues in Winnipeg
Sportsplex